The Goryeo Celadon Museum (고려청자박물관), formerly known also as the Gangjin Celadon Museum, is a museum located in Sadang-ri (Sadang Village), Gangjin County, South Jeolla, South Korea. It was opened in 1997 and features the history of the Gangjin Kiln Sites.

The museum's collection has about 30,000 pieces of Goryeo celadons and actively holds exhibitions for informing the people about Korean Celadons and its props. Some of kilns were reconstructed to reenact the way people of Goryeo made the celadons.

See also
Korean pottery and porcelain
Haegang Ceramics Museum in Shindun-myeon, Icheon

References

External links 
 Homepage
 Lonely Planet

Museums in South Jeolla Province
Ceramics museums
Art museums and galleries in South Korea
Museums established in 1997